The 2008 China League Two started in April 2008 and ended in December 2008. Guangdong Sunray Cave and Shenyang Dongjin finished top-2 and promoted to China League One 2009.

Final league tables

Southern Group

Northern Group

Rules for classification: 1st points; 2nd head-to-head points; 3rd head-to-head goal difference; 4th head-to-head goals scored; 5th goal difference; 6th goals scored.

Play-offs

The 2007–08 China University Football League winners China Three Gorges University qualified for the play-off first round. Runners-up Hohai University (Nanjing Baotai) and 3rd place Beijing Institute of Technology (Beijing BIT) were already playing in League Two and League One, so 4th place Shenzhen University qualified with Three Gorges University.

First round 

|-

|}

Second round

|-

|}

Promotion finals

All times local (GMT+8)

First leg

Second leg

Guangdong Sunray Cave won 4–1 on aggregate and promoted to China League One 2009.

Shenyang Dongjin 1–1 China Three Gorges University on aggregate. Shenyang Dongjin won 4–3 on penalties and promoted to China League One 2009.

Third place final

Champions final

Top Scorer

External links
 Fixtures, results and tables on RSSSF 
 News, fixtures, results and tables on Sohu 

3
China League Two seasons